James Augustine White (27 January 1878 – 19 January 1956) was an Australian rules footballer who played with Essendon in the Victorian Football League (VFL).

Notes

External links 

1878 births
1956 deaths
Australian rules footballers from Victoria (Australia)
Essendon Football Club players